Charles McDermott may refer to:

 Charlie McDermott (born 1990), American actor
 Charles McDermott (footballer) (1912–?), English footballer
 Charles McDermott (inventor) (1808–1884), American physician and inventor
 Chuck McDermott, American musician, songwriter and lyricist